The 6th National Hockey League All-Star Game took place at the Detroit Olympia, home of the Detroit Red Wings, on October 5, 1952. For the second year in a row, the format had the first and second All-Star teams, with additional players on each team, play each other. After the game ended in a tie for the second year in a row, the NHL decided that they would continue with the previous format of the Stanley Cup winner playing an all-star team.

The game

Game summary

Referee: Bill Chadwick
Linesmen: George Young, Doug Young

Rosters

Notes

Named to the first All-Star team in 1951–52.
Named to the second All-Star team in 1951–52.
Selected to play but injured prior to game.

Citations

References
 

06th National Hockey League All-Star Game
All-Star Game
Ice hockey competitions in Detroit
1952 in Detroit
October 1952 sports events in the United States